Dejima may mean or lead to:

 Dejima, a small, fan-shaped artificial island built in the bay of Nagasaki
 Dejima, the Japan branding of Guerrilla Games' proprietary game engine
 Dejima Takeharu, former sumo wrestler from Kanazawa
 Dejima Japanese Film Festival, a former film festival named after the island, Dejima